Proterocosma epizona is a moth of the family Agonoxenidae. It was described by Edward Meyrick in 1886. It is found on Fiji.

References

Moths described in 1886
Agonoxeninae
Moths of Fiji